Alco Creek is a stream in the U.S. state of Oregon. It is a tributary to Elk Creek.

Alco Creek was named after William Alcoe, a pioneer citizen.

Course
Alco Creek rises in a spring about 3 miles southeast of Alco Rock in Jackson County, Oregon, and then flows southeast to join Elk Creek about 2 miles northwest of Tatouche Peak.

Watershed
Alco Creek drains  of area, receives about 45.2 in/year of precipitation, has a wetness index of 273.07, and is about 15% forested.

References

Rivers of Oregon
Rivers of Jackson County, Oregon